Neville Whitehead may refer to:

Neville Whitehead (bassist), New Zealand jazz bassist and luthier
Nick Whitehead, real name Neville Whitehead, (1933-2002), Welsh sprinter